Weapon System 124A, given the codename Flying Cloud, was a project of the United States Air Force to use high-altitude balloons to deliver bombs and weapons of mass destruction on enemy targets. Tested in late 1954, the project was found to be unfeasible from the standpoint of accuracy, and the project was terminated the following year.

Design and development
Alongside the WS-119L program to develop long-distance, high-altitude balloons for aerial reconnaissance, the United States Air Force initiated WS-124A in early 1953 to develop a method of delivering weaponry to targets in the Soviet Union using hydrogen balloons; such a capability was considered potentially valuable in the event of a limited nuclear conflict, or in a "broken-back" scenario following a massive nuclear exchange.

It was believed that releasing chemical or biological agents from the balloons could contaminate an area "comparable in size to that affected by a low-yield nuclear weapon". Some sources claim that dirty bombs were also considered for carriage by WS-124A. In addition, the ability of the balloons to spread propaganda leaflets across enemy territory was considered useful.

Operational history
Flight tests of the WS-124A balloon system started on 8 October 1954; by 13 December, 41 balloons had been launched, 25 of which were fully operational test flights. Even allowing for the expected inaccuracy, however, only six of the balloons reached their intended target area, while five more were considered to be close enough. This was not considered an acceptable level of accuracy, and in August 1955 the WS-124A program was cancelled, the conclusion being that the weather forecasts were simply not accurate enough for the system to be operationally feasible. In addition, the advent of thermonuclear weapons had made the "broken-back war" scenario WS-124A was intended for appear an impossibility.

See also
Fire balloon
Bat bomb

References

Citations

Bibliography

Chemical weapon delivery systems
Biological weapon delivery systems
Balloon weaponry
Abandoned military projects of the United States
Aircraft first flown in 1954
United States biological weapons program
Chemical weapons of the United States